Redwood Meadows is a townsite in Alberta, Canada—the only townsite recognized by Alberta Municipal Affairs as of August 2020.

Redwood Meadows is unique in that it is a partially independent townsite, functioning similar to an incorporated Alberta town. It is different from all other Alberta towns due to:
its location within the Tsuut'ina 145 Indian reserve;
the leased nature of the land on which it is developed. 
Town Council is administered by the Town Council under a Stewardship Agreement with the Tsuut’ina Nation.

The Townsite of Redwood Meadows is located along Highway 22, approximately 20 km west of Calgary, 18 km south of Cochrane and 5 km northeast of Bragg Creek.

Redwood Meadows is located in census division No. 6 and in the federal riding of Foothills.

Administration 
Although the Townsite of Redwood Meadows is located within the Tsuut'ina 145 Indian reserve, it has its own Town Council consisting of a mayor and six councillors.

History 
In the early 1970s, the land upon which Redwood Meadows is developed was leased to Sarcee Developments Ltd. (SDL), a wholly owned Tsuu T'ina company. The Head Lease, originally 75 years in duration, commenced in 1974 and was to terminate in 2049. Effective April 21, 2021 a new lease was signed, which will now terminate in 2095.

Services 
Redwood Meadows shares municipal and emergency services with nearby municipalities through various contracts and agreements. It is serviced with water, sewer, parks and roads and has a volunteer fire department. The Redwood Meadows Golf and Country Club is located in the townsite.

In November 2021, Tsuut'ina police took over policing responsibility of the townsite from the RCMP.

Demographics 

The Townsite of Redwood Meadows had a population of 983 in the 2011 Census according to Alberta Municipal Affairs. Its most recent municipal census prior to this indicated that it had a population of 1,150 on June 30, 2005.

See also 
List of communities in Alberta
List of Indian reserves in Alberta

References

External links 

Designated places in Alberta
Localities on Indian reserves in Alberta